The George Peabody Medal, named in honor of George Peabody, is the highest honor bestowed by the Peabody Institute of Johns Hopkins University. The award, established in 1980, honors individuals who have made exceptional contributions to music in America.

Recipients
2019
Tori Amos

2018
Leon Fleisher

2016
Yo-Yo Ma

2015
Jessye Norman

2014
Kim Kashkashian

External links
Peabody Institute

Awards established in 1980
American music awards